The American Guild of Variety Artists (AGVA) is an American entertainment union representing performers in variety entertainment, including circuses, Las Vegas showrooms and cabarets, comedy showcases, dance revues, magic shows, theme park shows, and arena and auditorium extravaganzas. There is some overlap between the jurisdictions of AGVA and Actors' Equity.

AGVA was the successor to the American Federation of Actors organized by actress and singer Sophie Tucker and others in the late 1930s, and affiliated with the American Federation of Labor. In 1939 the AFL dissolved the AFA due to financial irregularities, and issued a new charter to AGVA (although some members went to Equity instead).

In 1963, then-AGVA president Joey Adams helped to finance and organize an August 5 variety show in Birmingham, Alabama, to raise funds for the August 28 March on Washington for Jobs and Freedom. Sharing the stage with Martin Luther King Jr. were Ray Charles, Nina Simone, Joe Louis, Johnny Mathis, James Baldwin and The Shirelles.

In 1958–59, the actress, singer and tap dancer Penny Singleton became the first woman elected president of an AFL-CIO union. She was active in supporting the 1967 strike of the AGVA-represented Rockettes against Radio City Music Hall), and was re-elected to the AGVA presidency in 1969. The most recent executive president was poet, songwriter, composer, and singer Rod McKuen, who held the post for 19 years until his death in 2015. As of the September 2021 vote count, the honorary president was Tommy Tune, the honorary vice-president was Barry Humphries, and the executive president was Judy Little. 

AGVA's offices are in New York and Los Angeles.

Georgie Award
AGVA Entertainer of the Year Awards, or the "Georgie Award" (after George M. Cohan), for variety performer of the year. Some of the past winners include:
 ABBA – Best Vocal Group of the Year, 1980
 Barbra Streisand – multiple awards
 Sonny & Cher – multiple awards

References

External links
 

AFL–CIO
Entertainment in the United States
Entertainment industry unions
Variety shows
Trade unions established in 1939
1939 establishments in the United States